Windsor and Maidenhead Borough Council is the local authority for the Royal Borough of Windsor and Maidenhead, which is a unitary authority in Berkshire, England. Until 1 April 1998 it was a non-metropolitan district.

Political control
Since the first election to the council in 1973 political control of the council has been held by the following parties:

Non-metropolitan district

Unitary authority

Leadership
The leaders of the council since 2007 have been:

Council elections

Non-metropolitan district elections
1973 Windsor and Maidenhead Borough Council election
1976 Windsor and Maidenhead Borough Council election
1979 Windsor and Maidenhead Borough Council election
1983 Windsor and Maidenhead Borough Council election (New ward boundaries)
1987 Windsor and Maidenhead Borough Council election
1991 Windsor and Maidenhead Borough Council election (Borough boundary changes took place but the number of seats remained the same)
1995 Windsor and Maidenhead Borough Council election

Unitary authority elections
1997 Windsor and Maidenhead Borough Council election
2000 Windsor and Maidenhead Borough Council election
2003 Windsor and Maidenhead Borough Council election (New ward boundaries reduced the number of seats by 1)
2007 Windsor and Maidenhead Borough Council election
2011 Windsor and Maidenhead Borough Council election
2015 Windsor and Maidenhead Borough Council election
2019 Windsor and Maidenhead Borough Council election (New Ward Boundaries and significant reduction in number of seats)

Borough result maps

By-election results

1997–2000

2000–2010

2011–2020

References

External links
Windsor and Maidenhead Council
By-election results

 
Politics of the Royal Borough of Windsor and Maidenhead
Council elections in Berkshire
Unitary authority elections in England